Pinckney is an unincorporated community in Warren County, in the U.S. state of Missouri.

History
Pinckney was platted in 1819, and named after Atossa Pinckney Sharp, the daughter of a county official.  A post office called Pinckney was established in 1833, and remained in operation until 1905. A variant name was "Kruegerville".

References

Unincorporated communities in Warren County, Missouri
Unincorporated communities in Missouri